Henrik Andersson (born 19 January 1977) is a retired Swedish badminton player. He represented his country in World Championships between 1999 and 2005.

Career summary 
After several national and international successes in the youth field, the Swedish U15, U17 and U19 titles, Andersson won three medals at the European junior championships in 1995. He won two bronze medals in doubles and a silver in team event. He won his first Swedish national title in 2002, which was followed by three more by 2005. In 1996 he won the Czech International, 1998 the Welsh International and 1999 the Iceland International. He also won 2005 Finnish International title in men's doubles. In 2001 he became German team champion with the BC Eintracht Südring Berlin.

Achievements

European Junior Championships 
Boys' doubles

Mixed doubles

IBF International 
Men's doubles

Mixed doubles

References 

1977 births
Living people
Swedish male badminton players